Abu ol Hasan Kola (also Romanized as Abū ol Ḩasan Kolā, Abū ol Ḩasan Kalā, and Abowlhasan Kolā) is a village in Gatab-e Jonubi Rural District, Gatab District, Babol County, Mazandaran Province, Iran. At the 2006 census, its population was 1,049, in 247 families.

References 

Populated places in Babol County